Space modulation is a radio amplitude modulation technique used in instrument landing systems (ILS) that incorporates the use of multiple antennas fed with various radio frequency powers and phases to create different depths of modulation within various volumes of three-dimensional airspace. This modulation method differs from internal modulation methods inside most other radio transmitters in that the phases and powers of the two individual signals mix within airspace, rather than in a modulator.

An aircraft with an on-board ILS receiver within the capture area of an ILS, (glideslope and localizer range), will detect varying depths of modulation according to the aircraft's position within that airspace, providing accurate positional information about the progress to the threshold.

Method used to determine aircraft position
The ILS uses two radio frequencies, one for each ground station (about 110 MHz for LOC and 330 MHz for the GS), to transmit two amplitude-modulated signals (90 Hz and 150 Hz), along the glidepath (GS) and the course (LOC) trajectories into airspace. It is this signal that is projected up from the runway which an aircraft employing an instrument approach uses to land.

The modulation depth of each 90 Hz and 150 Hz signal changes according to the deviation of the aircraft from the correct position for the aircraft to touchdown on the threshold. The difference between the two signal modulation depths is zero when the aircraft is on the correct course and glidepath on approach to the runway—i.e. No difference (zero DDM), produces no deviation from the middle indication of the instrument's needle within the cockpit of the aircraft.

See also
Difference in the Depth of Modulation
Instrument Landing System

Radio navigation